Heliozela sericiella is a moth of the Heliozelidae family found in Europe. The larvae mine the twigs of oaks, causing a gall.

Description
The wingspan is 6–8 mm. Head dark bronzy. Forewings bronzy-grey ; a small indistinct whitish spot on dorsum towards base, and a larger distinct one beyond middle. Hind wings grey. Adults are on wing in May and June in one generation per year.

The larvae feed on Quercus petraea, Quercus pubescens, Quercus robur and Quercus suber. Young larvae bore in the petiole, bark or a twig of their host plant. This causes the petiole to swell gall-like. When almost fully grown, it moves through the midrib into the blade, creating a small blotch. Finally, an oval excision is made, which the larvae uses to vacate the mine and drop to the ground. Here, pupation takes place. The pupa overwinters. Larvae can be found from June to July.

Distribution
It is found in most of Europe, except Spain, Slovenia and most of the Balkan Peninsula.

References

Heliozelidae
Gall-inducing insects
Leaf miners
Moths described in 1828
Moths of Europe
Oak galls
Taxa named by Adrian Hardy Haworth